Valerie is a 1957 American Western film directed by Gerd Oswald and starring Sterling Hayden, Anita Ekberg and Anthony Steel. The film was apparently inspired by Akira Kurosawa's 1950 classic Rashomon.

Plot
Rancher John Garth is arrested for critically wounding his wife Valerie and killing her parents. During Garth's trial, contradictory flashback sequences are depicted.

Cast

Production
Filming for Valerie started in December 1956. It was the only film that Anthony Steel and Anita Ekberg made together during their marriage.

Reception
Variety called the film "a challenging experiment."

In a contemporary review in Baltimore's The Evening Sun, reviewer Hope Pantell wrote: "This opus opens with an assortment of bodies, then proceeds to show, sometimes in painfully long-winded fashion, how they got to be so stiff."

Writing in The Philadelphia Inquirer, reviewer Samuel L. Singer assessed the lead actors' performances: "Lovely Anita Ekberg, Swedish beauty, displays her charms and engages in a limited amount of histrionics. Sterling Hayden is grimly nonsmiling as her husband, and Anthony Steel, her real-life husband, is convincing as the minister."

Home media
Valerie was released on DVD by MGM Home Video on September 26, 2011 via MGM's MOD (manufacture-on-demand) program through Amazon.com.

See also
 List of American films of 1957

References

External links
 
 
 

1957 films
1957 Western (genre) films
United Artists films
American Western (genre) films
Films directed by Gerd Oswald
Films scored by Albert Glasser
1950s English-language films
1950s American films